Jayanagar (officially Jayanagara) is a residential and commercial neighbourhood in Bangalore, India. It is one of the zones of Bruhat Bengaluru Mahanagara Palike. It is sub-divided into seven wards.

It is surrounded by Basavanagudi, JP Nagar, Wilson Garden, Banashankari 2nd stage, Gurappanapalya, Suddaguntepalya and BTM Layout among other areas.  It is in proximity to the Lalbagh Botanical Gardens. Jayanagar has 10 area blocks (including 4th 'T' Block), of which the 3rd and 4th blocks are largely commercial hubs, while the rest are mostly residential.

A 2010 survey by DNA Bangalore ranked Jayanagar as the most liveable place in Bangalore and still maintains the old charm of the city.

History
In Kannada, Jayanagar splits into Jaya and nagar literally meaning Victory City. It is not definitively known why that is. One school of thought is that Jaya comes from Mysore's Maharaja Jayachamarajendra Wadiyar.

The foundation of Jayanagar was laid in the year 1948. It was one of the first planned neighbourhoods in Bangalore and, at the time, the largest in Asia.

Jayanagar was traditionally regarded as the southern end of Bangalore. The "South End Circle", where six roads meet, and the historic Ashoka Pillar (which was to mark the southern end) bear this fact. While newer extensions have taken away this distinction from Jayanagar, it remains one of the more southern parts of the city.

In 1976, during the regime of D. Devaraj Urs, another iconic structure was added to Jayanagar, the Jayanagar BDA Shopping complex. It also housed the famous Puttanna Kanagal theatre. There was a fire in 2008. Later a new development project was initiated in 2011-2012 during the tenure of B. S. Yediyurappa and B. N. Vijaya Kumar worth around 193 crores that also involved demolishing the Puttanna Kanagal theatre.

Population
Jayanagar constituency has seven wards and had 1.8 lakh voters .

Schools and Colleges
Notable schools and colleges in Jayanagar include

 National College, Bangalore
 R. V. Pre University College
 Vijaya College, Bangalore
 Vijaya High school

Healthcare Centres 
 Jayanagar General Hospital
 Manipal Hospital
 Apollo Speciality Hospitals
 Cloudnine Hospital
 Chirag Hospital
 Keva Ayurveda Healthcare Pvt Ltd
 CB Physiotherapy Clinic

Notable residents
 
 
Prakash Belawadi, national award-winning filmmaker
Bharathi, Kannada actress
B. S. Chandrasekhar, former Indian cricketer, leg spinner
Shashi Deshpande, writer
V. V. Giri, former president of India
Puttanna Kanagal, Kannada movie director
Anil Kumble, Cricketer
N. R. Narayana Murthy, Infosys founder
Sudha Murty, Writer, Teacher, Philanthropist, Infosys Foundation Chairperson
Bhargavi Narayan, Kannada actress
Raja Ramanna, nuclear physicist
S. K. Ramachandra Rao, scholar
Tara, actress and politician
G. Venkatasubbiah, Kannada writer, Grammarian, editor, lexicographer 
Vishnuvardhan, Kannada actor

Geographic location

References

External links
 Bangalore Bus Route Search

Neighbourhoods in Bangalore